The 1891 Crescent Athletic Club football team was an American football team that represented the Crescent Athletic Club in the American Football Union (AFU) during the 1891 college football season. The team played its home games at Eastern Park in Brooklyn, compiled a 5–3 record (3–0 against AFU opponents), and won the AFU championship. Two of the team's losses were to Walter Camp's undefeated 1891 Yale team that did not allow its opponents to score a single point. Harry Beecher, who played for Yale from 1884 to 1887, was the Crescent team's quarterback and captain.

Schedule

References

Crescent Athletic Club
Crescent Athletic Club football seasons
Crescent Athletic Club Football